Eiseniella is a genus of Lumbricidae.

The genus was described in 1900 by W. Michaelsen.

It has cosmopolitan distribution.

Species:
 Eiseniella neapolitana
 Eiseniella tetraedra

References

Lumbricidae